Vidyut Gore (born 6 December 1976), previously known as Vidyut Kale and sometimes simply as Vidyut is an outspoken Indian part-time blogger, new media journalist, campaigner and activist. She became noted for work exposing domestic abuse in Indian families, and her work in exposing political and public corruption in India has also been covered in both the Indian media and international media. Her challenges to Indian digital censorship, has been covered in academic study, and United Nations CSTD studies. She has been quoted numerous times by mainstream Indian media on social and political issues. In August 2019, she launched the Alt Sarkar spoof alternative government role-play project that has received diverse media attention.

Blogs and websites 
Gore has been blogging since 2009 on issues in Indian society, being described in 2010 as a "Wikileaks" of India. In October 2011, she came to national prominence in India due to her posts about the murders of Keenan Santos and Reuben Fernandes in Mumbai, which exposed evidence that the media and Indian police seemed to ignore. In 2013, India Today said of Gore: "The daredevil homemaker-cum-blogger shot into news with her blogs on the Keenan and Reuben murders in Mumbai. It was her efforts that helped the poor families get the attention that their case required and helped prevent the killers from going scot-free". Indian spymaster B. Raman, said of her work on getting justice for the perpetrators of the Keenan-Reuben murders: "We owe a debt of gratitude to Vidyut".

In September 2012, Gore's blog again came to national attention when she received documents regarding prominent Indian public figures involved in corrupt land deals, which Gore posted on her blog; she resisted orders to remove the material stating that it was correct, however she was later forced to relent when she received notices on under the controversial Indian IT Act, which even if the material was accurate, would still expose Gore to litigation. The censorship of Gore's 2012 disclosures under the Indian IT Act was covered in academic research on digital censorship.

In 2013, she gained further national Indian attention when she created spoof websites on Kapil Sibal, then Gujrat Chief Minister Narendra Modi and Congress general secretary Rahul Gandhi. India Today, describing Gore as "the brain behind the sarcasm sites", said that: "Her spoofs are a direct result of her anger at the politicians who say wrong things or stray away from their promises".

In 2014, Gore was identified by The Telegraph as being one of a small number of "women who matter in India's Twitterverse", noting that she described herself as "intellectual anarchist". In 2015, The Times of India covered Gore as one of two important female Twitter bloggers in India, noting that her work brings her into direct conflict with the "BJPs "unofficial" army of trolls".

Gore has also been involved with other Indian political campaigns and is quoted about her views on Indian politics and society in mainstream media.

Gore summarised her work on aamjanta.com into a self published book: Thoughts on India at aamjanata.com: from differences to diversity.

Domestic abuse 

Gore has used her website to discuss issues like homophobia in India, and the extent of unreported domestic abuse in Indian families and society; for which Gore has received both international attention, academic and scholarly coverage, as well as mainstream Indian media attention. She has confronted domestic abuse in her own marriage and written about it. In March 2012 the New York Times quoted Gore as saying that "There is a silencing — from the family or from well-meaning friends who fear for the woman’s safety", and that: “The abuser never wants a spotlight on their actions, but breaking the silence is liberating. I stopped owning the shame when I spoke out”. She also told the New York Times that: "Most Indian women are in an unequal environment,” Ms. Gore said. “You go from your parents’ house to your husband's house. If they are no longer welcome in their parents’ home after marriage, what do they do when there's violence in their husband's home? Why should they end up homeless?”. In January 2015, one of Asia's highest rated think-tanks, the Observer Research Foundation, commented on Gore's struggle saying that: "When these women speak out about abuse, they are often labelled as hysterical, as seen clearly in the case of Kale", and that: "She faces as much abuse for her radical socio-political views as she gets for washing her dirty linen in public".

Alt Sarkar 
In August 2019, Gore launched Alt Sarkar (which translates as "Government" in Hindi), a spoof alternative Indian government administration on the Twitter platform, where Gore was elected Prime Minister by Twitter followers. The role-play has included elections, speeches, and alternative policies with a full 17-member cabinet. The Hindu reported, "What’s interesting is that the "PM" and her 17 cabinet ministers — who come from across the country — are not just tweeting about what they think the government should be doing. Instead, they do a deep dive into the portfolio to study the real issues faced by the sector and propose solutions for them in policy notes", and that online trolling by right-wing Indian parties had helped spread Alt Sarkar to a national audience. Gore has also been interviewed by international media on Alt Sarkar with The Boston Globe asking: "Could a spoof government on Twitter be the platform of political change in India?".

Soap and plants 
After the collapse of her marriage following the birth of her son in 2009, Gore was broke and started making soaps as gifts for friends and family on occasions, which eventually became a business for her. Sometime later, she combined it with her self-proclaimed "geeky interest in cultivating carnivorous plants", to develop an online home-made soap and specialist plant retailing business. Her products sometimes have names with political or social overtones, including "Bagon Mein Bahar Hai" (after Ravish Kumar used the term), "Urban Naxal", and "Kashmir"/"Silenced Valley".

Digital journalism 

In 2013, Gore's contribution was recognised by the United Nations Commission on Science and Technology for Development working group on "Democratizing the global governance of the Internet". Gore has contributed on rural affairs to Palagummi Sainath's digital People's Archive of Rural India, and to other English-Hindi language digital news websites such as The Quint, India Today'''s online DailyO news site, and Indian digital media entrepreneur Nikhil Pahwa's news site, MediaNama''.

Personal life 
Gore is an alumnus of the Indian Society for Applied Behavioural Science (ISABS) and described herself as "apolitical".

Gore was a trekking guide in the Himalayas, and a corporate trainer, before getting married and settling down in Virar, Mumbai as Vidyut Kale, and turning into a full-time mother on the birth of her son in 2009. Gore's son was born with congenital difficulties which restricted her to staying more at home and led to her focus on political blogging as an outlet. Ironically, she noted that her family and her then-husband were Bharatiya Janata Party supporters, and that they never read her blog. She described that during this period, her marriage "fell apart", and she divorced, returning to Vidyut Gore.

, Gore reported that she was in a committed relationship, and had no plans to remarry.

From her experience running web servers Gore has devoted section of her various online sites to giving insights and opinions on her experiences.

Bibliography

See also 
Meera Vijayann, independent journalist covering gender-based violence

Notes and references

Notes

References

External links 
 
 Aam Janata Online Journal

Indian bloggers
Living people
Indian women activists
Indian women bloggers
Indian women journalists
Indian women's rights activists
Indian women non-fiction writers
1975 births
Indian journalists
Indian feminists
Feminist bloggers
21st-century Indian women writers
21st-century Indian writers
Indian human rights activists